Wat Chulamani is a Buddhist temple in Wat Chulamani Village, Tha Thong Subdistrict, Mueang Phitsanulok District, Phitsanulok Province, Thailand.

Geography
Wat Chulamani is located on the east bank of the Nan River.

History
Wat Chulamani is the oldest standing temple in Phitsanulok Province.  It was built in the Sukhothai era.

Features
The temple is famous for its elaborate Khmer style pagoda.

Chula Manee